Zabana may refer to:

 Zabana language, an Oceanic language spoken in the Solomon Islands
 Zabana!, a 2012 Algerian film